The Mohegan Sun Arena is a 10,000 seat multi-purpose arena in Uncasville, Connecticut, located inside the Mohegan Sun casino resort. The arena facility features  of configurable exhibition space and a  clear span. It was built by the Perini Building Company, and opened in October 2001.

History
The multi-purpose facility has hosted a wide variety of events; including the American Kennel Club, WWE, concerts from major classical, country, jazz, metal, rap, rock, and pop acts, as well as sporting events such as PBR events, Bellator, NCAA games, PBA tournaments, early UFC bouts, and the World's Strongest Man Super Series Competition. The largest event on record to have been held at the arena was the inaugural Barrett-Jackson collector car auction in the Northeast in 2016, for which 90,000 tickets were sold to the multi-day event.

Major network and cable television broadcasting companies, including CBS, NBC, ABC, FOX, ESPN and CNN have all produced events through this arena.

Arena football
The arena originally served as home of the Mohegan Wolves arena football team until it was sold and moved to Manchester, New Hampshire in 2004. On July 19, 2001, Uncasville was awarded an AF2 expansion team. On December 12, 2001, Mohegan Sun and Dr. Eric Margenau, President/Chief Executive Officer of United Sports Ventures, announced that the new expansion AF2 franchise would be named the Mohegan Wolves. Margenau introduced Gary Porter, as the head coach for the team that would first take the field April 5, 2002 at the Mohegan Sun Arena against the Albany Conquest. Gary Porter, previously led the expansion Peoria Pirates to a 7–9 record in 2001.

The team name was selected through a "Name the Team" contest sponsored by WCTY, Mohegan Sun and X-Tra Mart. A Jewett City resident, came up with the winning name. The winner won four season tickets for the 2002 Mohegan Wolves season, dinner for four on the night of the team's first home game, and a team merchandise package.

Basketball
On January 28, 2003, the arena was announced as the official home court for the Connecticut Sun. Prior to the fall of 2002, the NBA operating model precluded any WNBA team without an NBA "brother" counterpart. By the time the Connecticut Sun moved in, Val Ackerman was the WNBA president and Mark L. Brown was the chairman of the Mohegan Tribe. Though sports betting was legalized in Connecticut on October 1, 2021, the casino has suspended WNBA betting from its sportsbook operation.

On September 8, 2005, as a companion to the arena, the Mohegan Sun casino opened a Connecticut Sun merchandise store called "Winter Essentials." It was the first store in the United States that sold professional basketball goods on casino ground. However, the store was closed when the casino underwent renovations in 2008. Connecticut Sun merchandise would be available in the Arena during games between 2009 and 2019.

The Connecticut Sun were not able to play at the arena in the 2020 season, as the entire season was relocated to IMG Academy in Bradenton, Florida due to the COVID-19 pandemic. After the conclusion of the 2020 WNBA season, the arena began holding its first events since the pandemic declaration in November 2020, when it hosted a series of college basketball games where fans were not permitted.

Lacrosse
On April 21, 2002, the Mohegan Sun Arena hosted the 2002 National Lacrosse League All-Star Game. The North Division (Calgary Roughnecks, Montreal Express, Ottawa Rebel, Rochester Knighthawks, Toronto Rock, Vancouver Ravens) defeated the South (Albany Attack, Buffalo Bandits, Columbus Landsharks, New Jersey Storm, New York Saints, Philadelphia Wings, Washington Power) by a score of 14–10. Steve Toll, of the Toronto Rock, was named the MVP of the event.

On August 5, 2014, the National Lacrosse League announced that the Philadelphia Wings would move to the Mohegan Sun Arena and be re-branded as the New England Black Wolves for the 2015 season. In their home opener, the Black Wolves defeated the Buffalo Bandits 12–8 in front of 5,768.

The team relocated in 2021 and now play as the Albany FireWolves.

Attendance history

Mixed martial arts
On January 11, 2002, Mohegan Sun Arena hosted its first MMA event, UFC 35, headlined by Jens Pulver vs B.J. Penn. The UFC also held UFC 45 at the arena, an event headlined by Matt Hughes vs. Frank Trigg.
Bellator MMA has consistently put on events at Mohegan Sun Arena, since 2009 that are shown below.

2009: Bellator 2, Bellator 11

2010: Bellator 15

2011: Bellator 39, Bellator 48

2012: Bellator 63

2013: Bellator 98

2014: Bellator 110, Bellator 123

2015: Bellator 134, Bellator 140, Bellator 144

2016: Bellator 153, Bellator 163

2017: Bellator 178, Bellator 185

2018: Bellator 194, Bellator 207

2019: Bellator 215, Bellator 216

2021: Bellator 262: Velasquez vs. Kielholtz

Professional wrestling 
The arena has hosted various WWE events, including frequently hosted episodes of Raw, SmackDown, and Main Event.

Seating
As of 2006, the seating can be configured into 5 common sports configurations. Basketball, boxing, bowling, rodeo, table tennis, lacrosse. It also can be reconfigured to fit many types of concerts: regular, fullhouse, centerstage, and halfhouse. The arena has won awards for being one of America's most modern concert venues. The arena was awarded the 2008 and 2010 Country Music Award for "Casino of the Year". It was also ranked the 4th best venue by Billboard Magazine.

Notable events

WNBA All-Star Game – 2005, 2009, 2010, 2013, 2015
National Lacrosse League 2002 All-Star Game.
American Athletic Conference women's basketball tournament (2014–2020)
Big East women's basketball tournament (2021 and beyond)
Naismith Memorial Basketball Hall of Fame 2020 enshrinement ceremony – May 15, 2021

NBA games

Strength Athletics Grand Prix

Since 2005, the arena has hosted one of the premier international strongman Grand Prix events.

References

External links
https://web.archive.org/web/20080731120733/http://www.mohegansun.com/entertainment/arena-360view-popup.html
http://www.wnba.com/sun/news/winteressentials.html Mohegan Sun Winter Essentials Store

Basketball venues in Connecticut
Connecticut Sun venues
Music venues completed in 2001
Sports venues completed in 2001
Montville, Connecticut
Indoor lacrosse venues in the United States
Lacrosse venues in Connecticut
Indoor arenas in Connecticut
New England Black Wolves
Mohegan
Sports venues in New London County, Connecticut